Euryglottis aper is a moth of the  family Sphingidae.

Distribution 
It is known from Colombia, Ecuador, Venezuela and Bolivia.

Description 
There are rather indistinct apical dots on sternites three to five and three lines forming a well-marked discal band on the forewing upperside.

References

Euryglottis
Moths described in 1856